George Wigzell (6 May 1812 – 1875) was an English first-class cricketer active 1849–60 who played for the Lancashire county cricket teams organised by Manchester Cricket Club; and for Kent County Cricket Club. He was born in Sevenoaks and died in Bonham, Fannin County, Texas. He played in eleven first-class matches, taking 42 wickets.

References

1812 births
1875 deaths
English cricketers
Kent cricketers
Lancashire cricketers